KDB Darulehsan (07) is the second ship of the Darussalam-class offshore patrol vessels. The vessel is in active service in the Royal Brunei Navy (RBN).

OPV program 
Brunei ordered the Darussalam class from Lürssen, the same company that Brunei contracted to sell the Nakhoda Ragam-class corvettes, and the first two vessels were delivered in January 2011. The second batch of two ships were delivered by 2014.

Construction and career 
KDB Darulehsan was built by Lürssen Werft in Germany around the late 2000s. She is part of the first batch delivered from Germany to Brunei. Darulehsan and KDB Darussalam were commissioned together on 4 May 2011 at Muara Naval Base. All four of her sister ships work in the offshore patrol vessel role.

Exercise Pelican 2011 
Singapore and Brunei concluded their flagship bilateral naval exercise from 10 to 13 July 2011 which consists of KDB Darulehsan, KDB Syafaat, KDB Itjihad and RSS Stalwart.

WPNS 2014 
On 14 April 2014, KDB Darulehsan set sail to Qingdao, China for Western Pacific Naval Symposium 2014 (WPNS 2014). It is the first time the Royal Brunei Navy visited China and participated in one of its naval exercises. KDB Darulehsan returned to port on 5 May 2014.

Goodwill visit to Vietnam, 2014 
On 30 April 2014, KDB Darulehsan arrived at Haiphong, Vietnam for a goodwill visit and to enhance diplomatic ties between the two countries.

Exercise Hornbill 24/2014 
KDB Darulehsan, KDB Ijtihad, KD Selangor and KD Ganas attendee Exercise Hornbill 24/2014 from 18 to 24 November 2014, hosted by both the Royal Brunei Navy and the Royal Malaysian Navy.

LIMA'15 
KDB Darulehsan was sent on a maritime exercise in Langkawi, Malaysia for Langkawi International Maritime & Aerospace Exhibition 2015 (LIMA'15) which lasted from 17–21 March 2015. She returned to Muara Naval Base on 26 March 2015.

Exercise Pelican 2015 
Singapore and Brunei concluded their flagship bilateral naval exercise on 27 November. Exercise Pelican ran from 23 to 27 November 2015, hosted by the Republic of Singapore Navy. The exercise featured RSS Valiant, KDB Darussalam and KDB Darulehsan.

Exercise Pelican 2019 
The Republic of Singapore Navy and Royal Brunei Navy held an exercise which consisted of RSS Tenacious, RSS Valour, RSS Vigour, KDB Darussalam, KDB Darulehsan and KDB Darulaman. All Republic of Singapore Navy ships left on 7 November 2019.

RIMPAC 2020 
KDB Darulehsan joined HMAS Stuart, HMAS Sirius, USS Rafael Peralta and RSS Supreme on their way to Pearl Harbor, Hawaii in preparation for RIMPAC 2020 on 6 August.

External links 

 ShipSpotting.com
 Military Factory.com
 Sultanate.com
 MarineTraffic.com
 Vesseltracker.com

References 

2009 ships
Royal Brunei Navy
Ships of Brunei